Mansel Bell (25 October 1888 – 10 June 1930) was a South African cricketer. He played in six first-class matches from 1906/07 to 1908/09.

References

External links
 

1888 births
1930 deaths
South African cricketers
Eastern Province cricketers
Western Province cricketers
South African emigrants to Southern Rhodesia